Vashukovo is a rural locality (a village) in Saminskoye Rural Settlement, Vytegorsky District, Vologda Oblast, Russia. The population was 12 as of 2002.

Geography 
Vashukovo is located 37 km north of Vytegra (the district's administrative centre) by road. Nikulino is the nearest rural locality.

References 

Rural localities in Vytegorsky District